Piano Quartet No. 3 may refer to:

 Piano Quartet No. 3 (Brahms)
 Piano Quartet No. 3 (Mendelssohn)